Events in the year 1868 in Argentina.

Incumbents
 President: Bartolomé Mitre (until 11 October); Domingo Faustino Sarmiento (from 12 October)
 Vice President: Marcos Paz (until 2 January); Adolfo Alsina (from 12 October)

Governors
 Buenos Aires Province: Adolfo Alsina (until 10 October); Emilio de Castro y Rocha (from 10 October)
 Cordoba: Félix de la Peña
 Mendoza Province: Nicolás Villanueva
 Santa Fe Province: Nicasio Oroño then Mariano Cabal

Vice Governors
Buenos Aires Province: vacant

Events
 2 January – The sudden death of Vice President Marcos Paz, in a cholera epidemic at Buenos Aires, results in a vacancy that is not filled for several months.
 12 April – The electoral college chooses Domingo Sarmiento as its new president by 79 out of 131 votes, making this the most closely contested election during the period.
 June – Henry G. Worthington becomes United States Ambassador to Argentina.

Births
 21 April – Rosendo Mendizabal, tango musician and composer (died 1913)
 20 July – José Félix Uriburu, first de facto President of Argentina (died 1932)
 4 October – Marcelo Torcuato de Alvear, politician and future President of Argentina (died 1942)
 6 December – Lisandro de la Torre, politician (died 1939)

Deaths
 2 January – Marcos Paz, Vice President of Argentina (born 1813; cholera)
 19 February – Venancio Flores, Uruguayan politician and general supported by Argentina (born 1808; assassinated)
 23 October – Mariquita Sánchez, Buenos Aires salonnière (born 1786)

References

 
1860s in Argentina
History of Argentina (1852–1880)
Years of the 19th century in Argentina